Trischistognatha palindialis is a moth in the family Crambidae. It was described by Achille Guenée in 1854. It is found in Brazil and Panama.

References

Evergestinae
Moths described in 1854